Archibald Ross MacKechnie (December 24, 1895 – August 15, 1967) was an American football coach. He served as the head football coach at Mississippi State University from the 1933 through 1934 seasons. During his two-season tenure, MacKechnie compiled an overall record of seven wins, twelve losses and one tie (7–12–1). A captain in the Army at the time, MacKechnie also had responsibility for instructing the Reserve Officers' Training Corps program at the time.

During World War II, MacKechnie commanded the 162nd Infantry Regiment during operations in New Guinea during the Salamaua–Lae campaign.

Head coaching record

References

External links
 

1895 births
1967 deaths
Mississippi State Bulldogs football coaches
United States Army personnel of World War II
United States Army officers